Under the Skin may refer to:

Film and television
 Under the Skin (1997 film), a British film
 Under the Skin (2013 film), a British film based on Michel Faber's novel
 Under the Skin (TV series), a 1994 Australian series
 Under the Skin, a 2003 digital film by Shelagh Cluett
 Under the Skin, a 2003 video by Skid Row
  Under the Skin  (2022 TV series), a Chinese series

Literature and theatre
 Under the Skin (novel), a 2000 novel by Michel Faber
 Under the Skin (play), a 2013 play by Yonatan Calderon
 Under the Skin, a 2003 novel by James Carlos Blake

Medical
 Subcutaneous tissue

Music
 Under the Skin (Ice album), 1993
 Under the Skin (Lindsey Buckingham album), 2006
 "Under the Skin", a 1991 song by Raven from Architect of Fear

Other uses
 Under the Skin (video game), a 2004 video game from Capcom
Blacksad: Under the Skin, a 2019 video game based on the Franco-Spanish comics.
 Under the Skin with Russell Brand, a podcast

See also
 Under My Skin (disambiguation)